Bartramia ithyphylla is a species of moss belonging to the family Bartramiaceae.

References

ithyphylla